Spilosoma pteridis, the brown tiger moth, is a moth in the family Erebidae. It was described by Henry Edwards in 1875. It is found in the United States in western Oregon and Washington, British Columbia and northern Idaho. The habitat consists of wet forests west of the Cascades, including coastal rainforests, low elevation mixed hardwood-conifer forests, as well as higher elevation conifer forests in the Cascades.

The length of the forewings is 11–13 mm. The forewings are dark reddish grey, with a faint darker grey discal spot and lines. The hindwings are dark smoky grey. Adults are on wing from late spring to early August.

The larvae probably feed on various herbaceous plants.

Subspecies
There are two subspecies:
Spilosoma pteridis pteridis
Spilosoma pteridis rubra (Neumoegen, 1881)

References

External links
Spilosoma pteridis at BOLD
Spilosoma pteridis at EOL
Spilosoma pteridis at BHL

Moths described in 1875
pteridis